Nicole Françoise Florence Dreyfus (born 27 April 1932), known professionally as Anouk Aimée or Anouk, is a French film actress, who has appeared in 70 films since 1947, having begun her film career at age 14. In her early years, she studied acting and dance besides her regular education. Although the majority of her films were French, she also made films in Spain, Great Britain, Italy and Germany, along with some American productions.

Among her films are Federico Fellini's La Dolce Vita (1960), after which she was considered a "rising star who exploded" onto the film world. She subsequently acted in Fellini's 8½ (1963), Jacques Demy's Lola (1961), George Cukor's Justine (1969), Bernardo Bertolucci's Tragedy of a Ridiculous Man (1981) and Robert Altman's Prêt à Porter (1994). She won the Golden Globe Award for Best Actress - Motion Picture Drama and the BAFTA Award for Best Actress and was nominated for the Academy Award for Best Actress for her acting in A Man and a Woman (1966). The film "virtually reignited the lush on-screen romance in an era of skeptical modernism," and brought her international fame.

She won the Award for Best Actress at the Cannes Film Festival for Marco Bellocchio's film A Leap in the Dark (1980). In 2002 she received an honorary César Award, France's national film award.

Aimée was known for her "striking features" and beauty, and considered "one of the hundred sexiest stars in film history," according to a 1995 poll conducted by Empire magazine. She has often portrayed a femme fatale with a melancholy aura. In the 1960s, Life magazine commented: "after each picture her enigmatic beauty lingered" in the memories of her audience, and called her "the Left Bank's most beautiful resident."

Early years
Aimée was born in Paris to actor Henri Murray (born Henry Dreyfus; 30 January 1907 – 29 January 1984) and actress Geneviève Sorya (née Durand; 23 June 1912 – 23 March 2008). According to one historian, although some have speculated that her background may be related to Captain Alfred Dreyfus, this has never been confirmed. Her father was Jewish, whereas her mother was Catholic. She was raised Catholic but later converted to Judaism as an adult.

Her early education took place at l'École de la rue Milton, in Paris; École de Barbezieux; Pensionnat de Bandol; and Institution de Megève. She studied dance at Marseille Opera. During World War II she was a pupil at Mayfield School, Mayfield in Sussex, but left before taking final exams. She studied theatre in England, after which she studied dramatic art and dance with Andrée Bauer-Thérond.

Career

Aimée (then still Françoise Dreyfus) made her film debut, at the age of fourteen, in the role of Anouk in La Maison sous la mer (1946), and she kept the name afterwards. Jacques Prévert, while writing Les amants de Vérone (The Lovers of Verona, 1949) specifically for her, suggested she take the symbolic last name Aimée, "that would forever associate her with the affective power of her screen roles." In French, it means "beloved."

Among her films were Alexandre Astruc's The Crimson Curtain (Le Rideau Cramoisi, 1953), Federico Fellini's La Dolce Vita (1960), Fellini's 8½ (1963), Jacques Demy's Lola (1961), André Delvaux's One Night... A Train (Un Soir, un Train, 1968), George Cukor's Justine (1969), Bernardo Bertolucci's Tragedy of a Ridiculous Man (1981), Robert Altman's Prêt à Porter (Ready to Wear, 1994) and, Claude Lelouch's A Man and a Woman (Un Homme et une femme, 1966) — described as a "film that virtually reignited the lush on-screen romance in an era of skeptical modernism." Words like "regal," "intelligent" and "enigmatic" are frequently associated with her, notes one author, giving Aimée "an aura of disturbing and mysterious beauty" that has earned her the status of "one of the hundred sexiest stars in film history," according to a 1995 poll conducted by Empire Magazine.

Because of her "striking features" and her beauty, she has been compared to Jacqueline Kennedy. Film historian Ginette Vincendeau has commented that Aimée's films "established her as an ethereal, sensitive and fragile beauty with a tendency to tragic destinies or restrained suffering."

Her abilities as an actress and the photogenic qualities of her face, its "fine lines, expression of elation and a suggestive gaze," helped her achieve success in her early films. Émile Savitry made an early portrait of her at 15, holding a kitten on the set of Carné's La Fleur de l'âge (1947). Among others of her films of this period were Pot-Bouille (1957), Les Amants de Montparnasse (Montparnasse 19) (The Lovers of Montparnasse, (1958) and La tête contre les murs (Head Against the Wall, 1958).

Besides the French cinema, Aimée's career includes films made in Spain, Great Britain, Italy and Germany. She achieved worldwide attention in Fellini's La Dolce Vita (1960) and Lola (1961). She appeared again in Fellini's , and would remain in Italy during the first half of the 1960s, making films for a number of Italian directors. Because of her role in La Dolce Vita, biographer Dave Thompson describes Aimée as a "rising star who exploded" onto the film world. He adds that singer-songwriter Patti Smith, who in her teens saw the film, began to idolise her, and "dreamed of being an actress like Aimée."

Aimée's greatest success came with the film A Man and a Woman (Un homme et une femme, 1966) directed by Claude Lelouch. Primarily due to the excellent acting by its stars, Aimée and Jean-Louis Trintignant and the beautiful musical score, the film became an international success, winning both the Grand Prize at the Cannes Film Festival in 1966 and two Oscars including Best Foreign Language Film. Tabery states that with her "subtle portrayal of the heroine—self-protective, then succumbing to a new love—Aimée seemed to create a new kind of femme fatale."

Film historian Jurgen Muller adds, "whether one like the film or not, it's still hard for anyone to resist the melancholy aura of Anouk Aimée." In many of her subsequent films, she would continue to play that type of role, "a woman of sensitivity whose emotions are often kept secret."

She starred in the American film production of Justine (1969), costarring Dirk Bogarde and directed by George Cukor and Joseph Strick. The film contained some nudity, with one writer observing, "Anouk is always impeccable, oozing the sexy, detached air of the elite . . . when she drops these trappings, along with her couture clothing, Anouk's naked perfection will annihilate you." While Aimee garnered some positive reviews, the film itself was a critical and box-office disaster.

Photojournalist Eve Arnold, assigned to photograph and write a story about Aimée and her role, spoke to Dirk Bogarde, who had known her since she was fifteen. He said that "She is never so happy as when she is miserable between love affairs," referencing her recent love affair with Omar Sharif. Arnold photographed Aimée, who talked about her role as the character Justine. Justine was also Jewish. Arnold recalls one of their talks:

Another American film, La Brava, starring Dustin Hoffman, was set to be made in 1984 but was never completed. Hoffman at first decided it would play better if he were in love with a younger girl rather than the original story's older woman. "Where are you going to get a good-looking older woman?" he asked. He rejected Faye Dunaway, feeling she was "too obvious." A month later, after a chance meeting with Aimée in Paris, he changed his mind, telling his producer, "I can fall in love with the older woman. I met Anouk Aimée over the weekend. She looks great." He begged his producer to at least talk to her: "Come on, get on the phone, say hello to her. . . Just listen to her voice, it's great."

Robert Altman, at another time, wanted to use Aimée in a film to be called Lake Lugano, about a woman who was a Holocaust survivor returning long after the war. She "loved the script," according to Altman. However, she backed out after discussing the part with him more thoroughly:

In 2002, she received an honorary César Award, France's national film award, and in 2003 received an Honorary Golden Bear at the Berlin International Film Festival. In the 1960s, Life magazine called her "the Left Bank's most beautiful resident ... after each picture her enigmatic beauty lingered" in the memories of her audience.

In late 2013, the Cinemania film festival in Montreal, Canada, paid tribute to Aimée's career.

Aimée reunited with director Claude Lelouch and co-star Jean-Louis Trintignant for a follow-up to Un homme et une femme and its sequel, A Man and a Woman: 20 Years Later (Un homme et une femme, 20 ans deja, 1986). The result, The Best Years of a Life (Les plus belles années d'une vie, 2019), was shown at Cannes out of competition.

Personal life
Aimée has been married and divorced four times: Edouard Zimmermann (1949–1950), director Nico Papatakis (1951–1954), actor and musical producer Pierre Barouh (1966–1969) and actor Albert Finney (1970–1978). She has one child, Manuela Papatakis (born 1951), from her second marriage.

Selected filmography

References

External links

 
 
 
 AIMÉE Anouk International Who's Who. Retrieved 1 September 2006.
 Sandy Flitterman-Lewis, Anouk Aimée, Jewish Women Encyclopedia
 Photographs and literature
 video 

Featured in film, The Golden Salamander, with Trevor Howard, Herbert Lom and Anouk Aimee.{Paul Thomson}

1932 births
Living people
Actresses from Paris
Best Foreign Actress BAFTA Award winners
Best Drama Actress Golden Globe (film) winners
Cannes Film Festival Award for Best Actress winners
César Honorary Award recipients
Honorary Golden Bear recipients
French film actresses
French people of Jewish descent
Converts to Judaism from Roman Catholicism
Jewish French actresses
People educated at St Leonards-Mayfield School
20th-century French actresses
21st-century French actresses